H. phyllostachydis may refer to:
 Hypocrea phyllostachydis, a fungus species of the genus Hypocrea
 Hypocreopsis phyllostachydis, a fungus species

See also
 Phyllostachydis (disambiguation)